Andreas Haider-Maurer was the defending champion but chose to compete at the St. Petersburg Open instead

Seeds

Draw

Finals

Top half

Bottom half

References
 Main Draw
 Qualifying Draw

Arimex,Singles
2015 Singles